Latino Galasso (25 August 1898 – 29 July 1949) was an Italian rower who competed in the 1924 Summer Olympics. In 1924 he won the bronze medal as crew member of the Italian boat in the men's eight competition.

References

External links
Latino Galasso's profile at databaseOlympics
Latino Galasso's profile at the Italian Olympic Committee
Biography of Latino Galasso 

1898 births
1949 deaths
Sportspeople from Zadar
Dalmatian Italians
Italian male rowers
Olympic bronze medalists for Italy
Olympic rowers of Italy
Rowers at the 1924 Summer Olympics
Olympic medalists in rowing
Medalists at the 1924 Summer Olympics
European Rowing Championships medalists